The 2011–12 ISU Junior Grand Prix was the 15th season of the series of junior international competitions organized by the International Skating Union. It was the junior-level complement to the 2011–12 ISU Grand Prix of Figure Skating contested by senior-level skaters. Skaters competed in the disciplines of men's singles, ladies' singles, pair skating, and ice dance.

Skaters earned points towards qualifying for the final at each of the seven Junior Grand Prix events. The top six skaters/teams in the series from each discipline met at the 2011–12 Junior Grand Prix Final, which was held concurrently with the senior final.

Competitions
The locations of the JGP events change yearly. In the 2011–12 season, the series was composed of the following events in autumn 2011:

The JGP Final was held in conjunction with the senior-level version.

Qualifying
Skaters who reached the age of 13 by July 1, 2011, but had not turned 19 (singles and females of the other two disciplines) or 21 (male pair skaters and ice dancers) were eligible to compete on the junior circuit. Unlike the senior Grand Prix, skaters for the JGP were not seeded by the ISU. The number of entries allotted to each ISU member federation was determined by their skaters' placements at the previous season's Junior World Championships in each respective discipline.

For the 2011–2012 season, in singles, the three best placed member nations at the 2011 Junior Worlds were allowed to enter two skaters in all seven events. Member nations which placed 4th through 6th were allowed to enter one skater in all seven events, those which placed 7th through 12th were allowed one skater in six of the seven events, and those with a skater who qualified for the free skate were allowed one skater in five of the events. Member nations which did not qualify for the free skate but placed 25th through 30th in the short program were allowed to enter one skater in four of the events, those which placed 31st and lower in the short program were allowed one skater in three of the events, and those countries which did not participate in the 2011 Junior Worlds were allowed one skater in two events. There were provisions for additional entries per member country if another country did not use all of its allotted entries.

In pairs, member nations which placed in the top five at the 2011 World Junior Championships were allowed to enter three entries in all four events which included pairs. Member nations which qualified for the free skate were allowed two entries in all four events, and all others were allowed one entry in all four events. There was no limit on host nation pair entries.

In ice dance, the multiple spots allowance was the same as for singles, through one entry in five events.

The host country was allowed to enter up to three skaters/teams in singles and dance, with no limit for pair teams from the host nation.

The general spots allowance for the 2011–2012 Junior Grand Prix events was as follows:

All other member nations had one entry per discipline in two of the seven events in singles and ice dance and one entry in all four events in pairs.

Junior Grand Prix Final qualification and qualifiers

Qualification rules
At each event, skaters/teams earned points toward qualification for the Junior Grand Prix Final. Following the 7th event, the top six highest scoring skaters/teams advanced to the Final. The points earned per placement was as follows:

There were seven tie-breakers in cases of a tie in overall points:
 Highest placement at an event. If a skater placed 1st and 3rd, the tiebreaker was the 1st place, and that beat a skater who placed 2nd in both events.
 Highest combined total scores in both events. If a skater earned 200 points at one event and 250 at a second, that skater would win in the second tie-break over a skater who earned 200 points at one event and 150 at another.
 Participated in two events.
 Highest combined scores in the free skating/free dance portion of both events.
 Highest individual score in the free skating/free dance portion from one event.
 Highest combined scores in the short program/short dance of both events.
 Highest number of total participants at the events.
If there was still a tie, the tie was considered unbreakable and the tied skaters all advanced to the Junior Grand Prix Final.

Qualifiers
The following skaters qualified for the 2011–2012 Junior Grand Prix Final.

Medalists

Men
In Milan, Italy, Lee June-hyoung became the first Korean male skater to medal at an ISU competition.

Ladies

Pairs

Ice dance

Medals table
The following is the table of total medals earned by each country on the 2011–2012 Junior Grand Prix. It can be sorted by country name, number of gold medals, number of silver medals, number of bronze medals, and total medals overall. The table is numbered by number of total medals.

Top JGP scores
Top scores attained in Junior Grand Prix competitions as of December 10, 2011 (JGP Final). Skaters ranked according to total score.

Men

Ladies

Pairs

Ice dance

References

External links
 Overall standings: Men, Ladies, Pairs, Ice dance
 Top scores: Men, Ladies, Pairs, Ice dance
 JGP Volvo Cup (Riga, Latvia): , ISU videos, ISU photos
 JGP Brisbane (Australia): , ISU videos, ISU photos
 JGP Baltic Cup (Gdansk, Poland): , ISU videos, ISU photos, Pixie World
 JGP Brasov Cup (Brasov, Romania): , ISU videos
 JGP Austria (Innsbruck): , ISU videos, ISU photos
 JGP Trofeo Walter Lombardi (Milan, Italy): , ISU videos, ISU photos
 JGP Tallinn Cup (Tallinn, Estonia): , ISU videos, ISU photos, Pixie World
 JGP Final (Quebec City, Canada):  ISU videos, ISU photos
 International Skating Union

ISU Junior Grand Prix
Junior Grand Prix
2011 in youth sport
2012 in youth sport